Harbor is the fourth studio release of all original music by Rhode Island-based singer-songwriter Marc Douglas Berardo.

TheWorkingMusician.com said this in their review of Harbor. "Some writers tell a story and let the listener draw their own conclusions. Others use the plot to drive home a point. Guitarist, songwriter, singer Marc Douglas Berardo falls into the latter category."

Track listing
 "Blue Wave" 
 "Shake Out The Dust" 
 "Take It Along"
 "Where The Road Turns to Shell and Sand"
 "Harbor"
 "Working" 
 "Abuse"
 "So, Regarding Me and You"
 "Better After All"
 "Ricky"
 "Trust Fund Sally" 
 "The Ghosts We Left Behind" 
 "I Will See You in My Dreams"

Personnel

Musicians
 Marc Douglas Berardo – vocals, acoustic guitar, harmonies 
 Dick Neal – banjo, electric guitar, organ, mandolin, Pedal steel guitar, Wurlitzer electric piano, piano, Classical guitar, Twelve-string guitar, percussion
 Steve Combs –  electric and acoustic Bass guitar
 Chris Berardo – percussion, box drum kit, harmony vocals
 Liam Bailey – electric guitar, piano, resonator guitar, mandolin, fiddle
 Mark Mirando – acoustic piano
 Larry Deming – viola, violin
 Susan Spalding – french horn

Production
Produced by: Dick Neal 
Mixed by: Dick Neal assisted by Pete Szymanski April 2005 to August 2005
Recorded by: Michael Branden at Hayloft Studios, Milford, Connecticut
Mastered by: Gene Paul at DB Plust Digital Services, New York City, October 2005

Artwork
Photography: Kim Mitchell
Graphic Design and Layout: Chris Brown

References

2005 albums
Marc Douglas Berardo albums